Mushroom Pictures is an Australian film production and distribution company which is part of the Mushroom Records group.

It was formed in 1993 in association with Regular Records to produce music related documentaries. In 1995 they announced they would enter feature film production.

Its chief executive from 1994 to 2009 was Martin Fabinyi.

Select credits
Tribal Voice (1994) (documentary on Yothu Yindi
Kate Ceberano and Friends (1994) (TV series) - consultant
The Singer and the Swinger (1999) (documentary)
Chopper (2000) - production company
Cut (2000) - distributor
Russian Doll (2001) - distributor
Horseplay (2003) - production company
Gettin' Square (2003) - production company
Wolf Creek (2005) - distributor
Macbeth (2006) - production company
Great Australian Albums Season 1 (2007) (documentary)
Cannot Buy My Soul (2008) (documentary)
Great Australian Albums Season 2 (2008) (documentary)
Cedar Boys (2009) - distributor
Anvil! The Story of Anvil (2009) (documentary) - distributor
Addiction (2010) (documentary)
Such Is Life: The Troubled Times of Ben Cousins (2010) (documentary)
Mad Bastards (2011) - distributor
Head First Series 1 (2013) (documentary) - production company
The Road to Freedom Peak (2013) (documentary) - production company
Sound City (2013) (documentary) - Australian distributor
The Last Time I Saw Richard (2014) (short) - production company
Head First Series 2 (2014) (documentary) - production company
Molly (2016) (television miniseries) - production company
Molly: The Real Thing (2016) (television documentary) - production company
Boys in the Trees (2016) - production company
Killing Ground (2015) - distributor

References

External links
Mushroom Pictures at IMDb
Official website

Film production companies of Australia